The Tatar Legions were auxiliary units of the Waffen-SS formed after the German invasion of the Soviet Union in 1941.

It included:
 Crimean Tatar Legion, comprising Crimean Tatars, Qarays, Nogais
 Volga Tatar Legion, which included also Bashkirs, Chuvashes, Mari, Udmurt, Mordwa

See also 
 Turkestan Legion
 Azeri Waffen SS Volunteer Formations

References

External links 

 Eastern Legion Volunteers

Legions
Foreign volunteer units of the Waffen-SS